"Rayos de sol" is a Spanish-language dance hit by Spanish music producer and DJ Jose de Rico featuring the Dominican-Spanish reggaeton, house, Latin and dance singer Henry Mendez. It follows the success of their joint Spanish hit "Te fuiste".

"Rayos de sol" became a big hit in Spain reaching #2 in the Spanish Singles Chart, and then became an international hit for them in Europe and internationally with chart appearances notably in France and Switzerland.

According to PROMUSICAE, the publisher of the Official Spanish Singles and Albums Charts, "Rayos de sol" was the third biggest single in Spain in 2012.

Track list
"Rayos de sol" (original mix)
"Rayos de sol" (extended version)

Chart performance

Weekly charts

Year-end charts

References

2012 singles
Spanish-language songs
2012 songs